The Clie PEG-N760C is a Personal Digital Assistant (PDA) made by Sony. The PEG-N760C ran Palm OS, and was one of the first Palm OS devices to have a High-Res Color Screen and a built in MP3 Player.

Specifications

Palm OS: 4.1
CPU: 33 MHz Dragonball VZ
Memory: 8MB, 8MB Memory Stick included
Display: 320 x 320, 16bit Color
Sound: Internal audio amplifier and speaker, Headphone out.
External Connectors: USB
Expansion: Memory Stick
Wireless: Infrared
Battery: Rechargeable Li-Ion
Size & Weight: 2.88 (L) x 4.75 (W) x 0.69 (H) inches, 5.65 oz.
Color: Silver

Weaknesses
Memorystick with magic gate came later. MS Pro only had up to 128mb (or had a double sided 128 as the maximum size available to store data.
Small volume slider controls had a tendency to break.

External links
 IGN review of the PEG-N760C (may have to go to cache site)
 Gadgeteer review of the PEG-N760C

N760C